Steve Cacciatore is a retired American soccer forward who played professionally in the American Soccer League and the North American Soccer League.

Cacciatore grew up on "The Hill" (an Italian neighborhood) in St. Louis, Missouri and graduated from St. Louis University High School.  He then attended Southern Illinois University Edwardsville where he played on the men's soccer team from 1972 to 1975. He, along with the rest of the 1972 team, was inducted into the SIUE Athletic Hall of Fame in 2005. On January 14, 1976, the Rochester Lancers selected Cacciatore in the third round of the North American Soccer League draft.  The Los Angeles Skyhawks of the American Soccer League drafted him a week later.  Cacciatore signed with the Skyhawks for the 1976 season. In 1977, he played one game for the St. Louis Stars in the North American Soccer League.  The St. Louis Soccer Hall of Fame inducted Cacciatore in 2005.  His brothers, Chris & Jeff also played professionally.

References

External links
NASL/ASL stats

1954 births
Living people
Soccer players from St. Louis
American soccer players
American Soccer League (1933–1983) players
Los Angeles Skyhawks players
North American Soccer League (1968–1984) players
St. Louis Stars (soccer) players
SIU Edwardsville Cougars men's soccer players
Association football forwards
Cincinnati Comets players